Hamand (also Romanized as Hamond, Hamund, and Homand; also known as Hāmūn) is a village in Khusf Rural District, Central District, Khusf County, South Khorasan Province, Iran. At the 2006 census, its population was 225, in 71 families.

References 

Populated places in Khusf County